Acid Survivors Trust International (ASTI) is a UK-based international non-profit organization aiming to end acid and burns violence at a global level. In addition to public education and awareness campaigns, ASTI supports organizations in Bangladesh, Cambodia, India, Nepal, Pakistan and Uganda that they have helped to form. The organization was founded in 2002 and is a registered charity under English law.

Impact
Acid Survivors Trust International's work has produced change in challenging acid violence. The organisation has been involved in many campaigns, such as those to introduce acid laws in Cambodia, Pakistan and Bangladesh. In the case of the latter, the incidence of recorded acid violence fell from 500 cases in 2002 to less than 100 in 2012, over a 70% reduction. ASTI are also actively involved in administering medical support for survivors: former ASTI trustee Dr Ron Hiles OBE, has performed over one thousand reconstructive surgery operations and trained hundreds of surgeons who have treated thousands of patients. In 2016, The Trust Law/Thomson Reuters Foundation shortlisted ASTI for a Solicitors Journal Award for Working in Partnership with J Sagar Associate, Baker & McKenzie and P&G Asia for the comparative law study that looked at acid laws in the UK, India, Cambodia and Colombia (see research).

Supporting survivors and changing attitudes 
ASTI's impact abroad has been primarily centred on providing aid and support to attack survivors whilst challenging common misconceptions around victim-hood. An example of how these have been achieved can be found in a two-year programme launched by ASTI in collaboration with local partners Burns Violence Survivors Nepal and Acid Survivors Foundation Pakistan in the delivery of a British Government Department for International Development funded project. The project led to: 
 152 survivors benefiting from medical and psycho-social support services
 Awareness and sensitization on the causes and consequences of acid violence, acid crime legislation, police procedures and immediate response to acid attack to 513 community leaders
 151 survivors benefit from legal support
 54 survivors access professional skills training and financial support
 6,360 community members reached through campaign materials or street theatre
 In Pakistan two successful radio campaigns reaching 4,400,000 people across the target regions spreading awareness on acid violence and on how to respond to an acid attack.
 
In another two-year project, ASTI was supported by the United Nations Trust Fund (UNTF) to work with local partners in Cambodia, Nepal and Uganda in supporting survivors. The project contributed to:
 
 An acid law and sub-decree being passed in Cambodia.
 The Uganda National Bureau of Standards producing guidelines to regulate the use of acid.
 In Cambodia, health and legal notification and referral systems strengthened in 18 provinces and increasing the number of lawyers and legal aid professionals willing to support survivors in taking cases forward.
 In Cambodia 300 women in 2 provinces receive information on legal and medical support.

Violence Against Women and Girls (VAWG) 
Acid violence is considered gender-based violence in many countries as it affects women disproportionately. The Convention on the Elimination of all forms of Discrimination Against Women (CEDAW) describes gender-based violence as "violence that is directed against a woman because she is a woman or that affects women disproportionately".
Pakistan, India, Bangladesh and Cambodia have all ratified this convention yet are countries where acid violence is predominantly perpetrated by men against women.

Changing laws 
Alongside its local partners, ASTI has played a central role in the fight to tackle root causes of acid violence, ensure proper justice for survivors and prevent further attacks. The following are examples of ASTI's work in changing laws:
 Acid Survivors Foundation Bangladesh, which played a key role in policy change in Bangladesh. Bangladesh was the first country to pass a law banning acid violence, in 2002.
 The organisation's local partner Acid Survivors Foundation Pakistan campaigned hard and played a critical part in helping to bring about The Acid Control and Acid Crime Prevention Bill in 2011 which has contributed to the decline in attacks. Once known to be the country with the highest number of such attacks (496 recorded attacks in 2002) and the highest incident rates for women, it has since experienced a drastic drop (approx. 70 attacks recorded in 2012) in the frequency of acid assaults.
 ASTI supported the work of Cambodian Acid Survivors Charity (CASC) in bringing about legal reform. Cambodia has also adopted the Acid Law to criminalize and penalize perpetrators. A year after it was passed in 2012, the country also passed regulations governing the sale and use of concentrated acid.
 With over 100 victims of attack annually, Colombia has strengthened its legislative framework and enacted a law in January 2016 to impose sentences of 12 to 50 years in jail to perpetrators of acid attacks. The law was named after acid attack survivor Natalia Ponce de Leon who was attacked in 2014 and has since campaigned for stricter laws on acid violence.
 The Colombian government also sought information from ASTI on tackling acid violence. At the invitation of the Colombian government ASTI executive director visited Colombia on two occasions (2014 and 2015) to provide expert advice.
 Following the sharp increase in acid violence in the UK, the organisation was approached British Home Office officials, the Shadow Home Secretary and cross-party MPs seeking advice on tackling the surge in acid attacks. Consequently, they provided policy briefings as well as a detailed legal memorandum on loopholes in current laws. Consequently, Amber Rudd announced that the Home Office is to ban the sale of most corrosive substances to under-18s as well as establish a six-month minimum sentence for anyone caught for the second time carrying acid without good reason.

Media coverage
The organisation is often called on for expert comment whenever an acid attack is reported in the media. ASTI has featured in and provided material for coverage of acid violence in media outlets including the BBC, ITV, Channel 4, CNN, The Independent, The Guardian and The New York Times.

Patron
 Anne, Princess Royal of Britain

References

External links
 Acid Survivors Trust International

Domestic violence-related organizations
Violence against women
Violence against women in Pakistan
Women's rights in Asia
Charities based in London
Acid attack victims